William Wallace Davis , DD (10 December 1908 - 29 May 1987
) was a Canadian Anglican bishop in the 20th century.

Davis was educated at the University of Bishop's College, Lennoxville and ordained in 1932.
After a curacy at  St Matthew, Ottawa he was the incumbent at Coaticook before becoming the Archdeacon of Quebec in 1947. He was Dean of Nova Scotia and Rector of the Cathedral Church of All Saints, Halifax from 1952 to 1958 when he became Bishop Coadjutor of Nova Scotia. He was appointed its full diocesan five years later. In 1972 he became Archbishop of Nova Scotia and Metropolitan of the Ecclesiastical Province of Canada, retiring in 1975.

References

1908 births
Bishop's University alumni
Anglican Church of Canada archdeacons
Anglican Church of Canada deans
20th-century Anglican Church of Canada bishops
Anglican bishops of Nova Scotia and Prince Edward Island
Metropolitans of Canada
1987 deaths